The first USS Montauk was a single-turreted Passaic-class monitor in the Union Navy during the American Civil War.

It saw action throughout the war.  It was used as the floating prison for the conspirators in the Abraham Lincoln assassination and was the site of the autopsy and identification of assassin John Wilkes Booth.

Construction
Montauk was built by John Ericsson at Continental Iron Works, Greenpoint, Brooklyn; launched on October 9, 1862; and commissioned at New York on December 14, 1862, Commander John L. Worden in command.

Service

A principal ironclad in the naval attack on Charleston, South Carolina, Montauk departed New York on December 24, 1862, arriving Port Royal, South Carolina on January 19, 1863, to join the South Atlantic Blockading Squadron. Although hit 13 times, Montauk was undamaged. The ironclad made a second attack on February 1, badly battering the fort; but Montauk was hit 48 times. She destroyed the blockade runner Rattlesnake on February 28 in Ogeechee River but while descending the river was herself damaged by a torpedo (mine) which exploded under her.

Montauk steamed into the North Fork of the Edisto River on April 1 in preparation for the attack on Charleston. At midafternoon on April 7, Admiral Du Pont's ironclads attacked Fort Sumter. The Union ships braved intense fire from Confederates coastal artillery, and kept their own guns operating effectively until withdrawing toward evening. Damage to the monitors prevented Du Pont from resuming the attack the next day with Montauk taking 20 hits.

The ironclads launched an attack on Fort Wagner, Morris Island on July 10. Capturing this island was important as it would permit access to the interior defenses of Charleston Harbor. Assuming command of the naval forces, John Dahlgren boarded Montauk on July 16 and after consultation with the captains, renewed the attack on Fort Wagner and bombarded it daily until it was evacuated by the Confederates on September 6. The ships then turned their attention to Fort Sumter and Fort Moultrie operating for the rest of the year against these fortifications which guarded the Cradle of the Rebellion. However, the Confederate works would never be taken by sea.

Montauk remained off Charleston until July 1864, when she shifted operations to the Stono River. In February 1865, she transferred to the Cape Fear River. Proceeding to the Washington Navy Yard after the end of the conflict, she served as a floating bier for assassin John Wilkes Booth on April 27 and a floating prison for six accomplices.

She was decommissioned at Philadelphia, Pennsylvania, in 1865. She remained there until sold to Frank Samuel on April 14, 1904, except for a stint from May 1898 to March 1899, when she served with a crew primarily consisting of local naval reservists to protect the harbor of Portland, Maine during the Spanish–American War.

References

Bibliography

Additional technical data from

External links

navsource.org: USS Montauk
hazegray.org: USS Montauk
Photograph of the U.S.S. Montauk from the Maine Memory Network

Passaic-class monitors
Ships built in Brooklyn
1862 ships
Ships of the Union Navy
American Civil War monitors of the United States
Spanish–American War monitors of the United States